Gopal Singh Rana is an Indian politician from Uttarakhand and a three term Member of the Uttarakhand Legislative Assembly. Gopal represented the Khatima Assembly constituency in the 1st Uttarakhand Assembly, 2nd Uttarakhand Assembly and Nanakmatta Assembly constituency in the 5th Uttarakhand legislative Assembly.

Positions held

References

External links
 

Living people
Year of birth missing (living people)
20th-century Indian politicians
Indian National Congress politicians from Uttarakhand
People from Udham Singh Nagar district
Uttarakhand MLAs 2022–2027
Uttarakhand MLAs 2002–2007
Uttarakhand MLAs 2007–2012